Yahya Sinwar (born 1962; also called Yehya Al-Sinwar and spelled Yehiya Sinwar or Yehiyeh Sinwar) is the current Palestinian leader of Hamas in the Gaza Strip, having taken over from Ismail Haniyeh in February 2017. He was one of the co-founders of the security apparatus of Hamas. He is the second most powerful figure within Hamas.

In September 2015, Sinwar was designated a terrorist by the United States government, and Hamas and the Izz ad-Din al-Qassam Brigades have also been designated terrorist organisations by the United States and other countries and organisations.

Early life
Sinwar was born Yahya Ibrahim Hassan Sinwar in 1962, in a refugee camp in Khan Yunis, when it was under Egyptian rule, where he spent his early years. His family is from Al-Majdal Asqalan (Ashkelon), moved to the Gaza Strip in 1948. After he graduated from high school at Khan Yunis Secondary School for Boys, he went on to the Islamic University of Gaza where he received a bachelor's degree in Arabic Studies.

Career
Sinwar was first arrested in 1982 for subversive activities and he served several months in the Far'a prison where he met other Palestinian activists, including Salah Shehade, and dedicated himself to the Palestinian cause. Arrested again in 1985, upon his release he together with Rawhi Mushtaha co-founded the Munazzamat al Jihad w’al-Dawa (Majd) security organisation, which worked to, inter alia, identify Israeli spies in the Palestinian movement, and which in 1987 became the "police" of Hamas.

In 1988, he masterminded the abduction and killing of two Israeli soldiers and the murder of four Palestinian whom he suspected cooperating with Israel, for which he was arrested, convicted of murder, and sentenced to four life sentences in 1989. He tried to escape several times but was always caught. Sinwar served 22 years of his sentence, and was the most senior Palestinian prisoner freed among 1,026 others in a 2011 prisoner exchange for IDF soldier Gilad Shalit, who had been held hostage by Hamas for five years.

In February 2017 Sinwar was secretly elected Hamas leader in the Gaza Strip, taking over from Ismail Haniyeh. In March, he established a Hamas controlled administrative committee for the Gaza Strip, which meant that he opposed any power sharing with the Palestinian Authority in Ramallah. Sinwar rejects any reconciliation with Israel. He has called on militants to capture more Israeli soldiers.
In September 2017, a new round of negotiations with the Palestinian Authority began in Egypt, and Sinwar agreed to dissolve the Hamas administrative committee for Gaza. More recently he has silenced hard-line voices in Gaza overruling the use of tunnels that Muhammad Deif wanted to use to sneak fighters into Israel before they were shut down by new classified Israeli technology in 2017.

On 16 May 2018, in an unexpected announcement on Al Jazeera, Sinwar stated that Hamas would pursue "peaceful, popular resistance" opening the possibility that Hamas, which is considered a terrorist organisation by many countries, may play a role in negotiations with Israel. A week earlier he had encouraged Gazans to breach the Israeli siege, saying "We would rather die as martyrs than die out of oppression and humiliation", and adding, "We are ready to die, and tens of thousands will die with us."

In March 2021, he was elected to a second four-year term as the head of Hamas Gaza branch in an election held in secret. He is the highest-ranking Hamas official in Gaza and Gaza's de facto ruler, as well as the second most powerful member of Hamas after Haniyeh.

On 15 May 2021, an Israeli airstrike was reported to have hit the home of the Hamas leader, there were no immediate details of any deaths or injured. The strike took place in the [Khan Yunis] region of southern Gaza in the midst of evergrowing tension between Israelis and Palestinians. However, in the week that followed, he appeared publicly at least four times. The most obvious and daring thereof was in a press conference on 27 May 2021, when he mentioned (on air) that he will go home after the press conference (on foot), and invited the Israeli Minister of defense to take the decision to assassinate him in the following 60 minutes, until he reaches his home. Sinwar spent the next hour wandering in Gaza streets and having selfie photos with the public.

Health
On 1 December 2020, Sinwar tested positive for COVID-19 and was reportedly following the advice of health authorities and taking precautionary measures. A spokesman for the group also said that he was in "good health and [...] pursuing his duties as usual."

References

External links

Hamas military members
Hamas members
1962 births
Living people
Islamic University of Gaza alumni
People from Khan Yunis Governorate